The Erskine Fire was a wildfire that was burning in the Lake Isabella area of Kern County. It was the second-largest wildfire of the 2016 California wildfire season. It was also the first fire of the year to have fatalities and is the 15th most destructive fire in state history.

Events 

Friday evening Governor Jerry Brown declared a state of emergency for Kern County.

On June 28, Kern County Fire Department confirmed that 257 homes had been destroyed by the fire.

Two Red Cross Shelters were set up north of Lake Isabella 

On July 11 the fire was 100% contained.

Fatalities 
On Friday, June 24, officials confirmed that 2 people had been killed by the fast moving fire. Officials also stated that cadaver dogs were being used to search for possible additional victims. The deceased victims were an elderly couple who died while attempting to flee their home.

On Saturday June 25, a third set of remains was found, though the body had been burned so badly that it is unclear on whether or not the remains belong to a human or an animal. Monday morning, the Kern County Sheriff's Office confirmed that the remains belonged to an animal and not to a human.

See also

2016 California wildfires

References

External links
 California wildfires on the US Forestry Incident Information System  (InciWeb)
 https://bakersfieldnow.com/amp/news/local/erskine-fire-cause

2016 California wildfires
Wildfires in Kern County, California